Calonotos aurata is a moth of the subfamily Arctiinae. It was described by Francis Walker in 1854. It is found in Venezuela.

References

Arctiinae
Moths described in 1854